is an anime adaptation of the light novel series, based on the Muv-Luv visual novel franchise.

The anime is produced by ixtl and Liden Films  and directed by Tetsuya Watanabe, series composition by Tatsuto Higuchi, music by Elements Garden, character design by Shuichi Hara and sound direction by Satoshi Motoyama respectively. The anime series began airing on January 10, 2016 on TV Tokyo, TV Osaka, TVQ Kyushu Broadcasting, TV Hokkaido, AT-X, TV Setouchi, TV Aichi and Nico Nico Douga in Japan. Outside of Japan, the series is available via streaming on Crunchyroll. In November 2017, Crunchyroll released dubs of the series in German, French, Spanish, and Portuguese.

In 1983, the East German Army 666th TSF Squadron, “Schwarzes marken,” is a special-response force tasked with assaulting BETA forces. They target Laser and Heavy Laser class BETA to disable their enemy's immense firepower. This merciless team's orders are given the highest priority, and they follow them so exactly that the 666th is known to ignore allied distress calls that would interfere with an ongoing mission, even if only for a moment.

The soundtrack is composed by Evan Call of Elements Garden.

Episode list

Schwarzesmarken

References

External links

List of episodes at the Official site 

Lists of anime episodes
2016 anime television series debuts
Television series set in East Germany

ja:シュヴァルツェスマーケン#各話リスト
zh:Schwarzesmarken#各話列表